Sirsoli is a village in Telhara tehsil of Akola district and is known for the Battle of Argaon. The Battle of Argaon took place on 28 November 1803, between the British under the command of General Arthur Wellesley (later the Duke of Wellington) and the forces of The Rajah of Berar under Sindhia of Gwalior. The battlefield was located between Argaon and Sirsoli.

In recent days, Sirsoli is known for Sapta Khanjeri Vadak Satyapal Maharaj. He is a real godman with a very progressive attitude.  Thousands throng to listen him everywhere in Maharashtra. Khanjeri means "small drum" and Satyapal Maharaj beats seven Khanjeris at a time while singing Bhajans of famous saints guiding the common man to a better life. Nowadays he got "Dalit Mitra Purskar 2009", "Vyasanmukti Purskar 2001" Of government of Maharashtra. Also Satyapal Maharaj has performed in Marathi Sahitya Sammelan 2010 in Thane Mumbai. He did nearly 12,000 shows of sapt khanjari all around India, he performs on the basis of the "gramgeeta" of "sant tukdoji maharaj", gramgeeta is the book which changes the life of common man.

Villages in Akola district